Nancy Steele Is Missing! is a 1937 American drama film directed by George Marshall and Otto Preminger and starring Victor McLaglen, Walter Connolly and Peter Lorre.

The film's sets were designed by the British art director Hans Peters.

Partial cast
 Victor McLaglen as Dannie O'Neill  
 Walter Connolly as Michael Steele  
 Peter Lorre as Prof. Sturm  
 June Lang as Sheila O'Neill - aka Nancy Steele 
 Robert Kent as Jimmie Wilson  
 Shirley Deane as Nancy  
 John Carradine as Harry Wilkins  
 Jane Darwell as Mrs. Mary Flaherty  
 Frank Conroy as Dan Mallon  
 Granville Bates as Joseph F.X. Flaherty  
 George Taylor as Gus Crowder  
 Kane Richmond as Tom - Steele's Chauffeur  
 Margaret Fielding as Miss Hunt  
 DeWitt Jennings as Doctor on Farm  
 George Chandler as Counter Clerk  
 George Humbert as Giuseppe Spano  
 Edgar Dearing as Detective Flynn

References

Bibliography
 Thomas, Sarah. Peter Lorre: Face Maker: Constructing Stardom and Performance in Hollywood and Europe. Berghahn Books, 2012.

External links
 

1937 films
1937 drama films
American drama films
Films directed by George Marshall
Films scored by David Buttolph
Films scored by Cyril J. Mockridge
20th Century Fox films
American black-and-white films
1930s English-language films
1930s American films